Tigers, Not Daughters is about four sisters, with one of them dying by falling out of a window. The dead sister haunts the remaining sisters in the house they live in. The novel is written by Samantha Mabry.

Publishers Weekly wrote that the novel "read more like a series of vignettes." NPR reviewed it favorably.

References

2020 American novels
American young adult novels
Workman Publishing Company books

2020 children's books